Besna Kobila (Serbian Cyrillic: Бесна Кобила, meaning "mad mare") is a mountain in southeastern Serbia and small ski center. Its eponymous highest peak has an elevation of 1,923 m. It lies 35 km to the east from the city of Vranje. There is a mountain chalet Besna Kobila from where it takes an hour to hour and a half to reach the summit on foot. It is known for its stormy weather, so the best months for climbing are during the warmer part of the year.

Besna Kobila used to have 9 months of snow a year, which makes it suitable for ski tourism. As of 2010, there is only the mountain chalet, which has been used for accommodation of students. The "skyway" (nebeski put) – road running over the vast pastures on the highland – lies at the altitude of 1800 m and is suitable for mountain biking, safari bus and off-roading. There are ambitious plans to build a bigger ski center on the mountain, and the municipality is searching for foreign investors.

Gallery

References

External links
  Ski center Besna Kobila
 
 off-roading and biking tour on Besna Kobila Photos

Mountains of Serbia
Rhodope mountain range